Nicklas Kulti and Mikael Tillström were the defending champions but did not compete that year.

Daniel Nestor and Sandon Stolle won in the final 6–4, 6–7(5–7), 6–1 against Max Mirnyi and Patrick Rafter.

Seeds
Champion seeds are indicated in bold text while text in italics indicates the round in which those seeds were eliminated.

  Daniel Nestor /  Sandon Stolle (champions)
  Yevgeny Kafelnikov /  David Prinosil (quarterfinals)
  Joshua Eagle /  Nenad Zimonjić (semifinals)
  Wayne Black /  Kevin Ullyett (semifinals)

Draw

External links
 2001 Gerry Weber Open Doubles Draw

2001 Gerry Weber Open